Bomb City is a 2017 American crime film directed by Jameson Brooks and co-written by Jameson Brooks and Sheldon R. Chick. The film is based on the death of Brian Deneke, the homicide that revealed the cultural clash between the local jocks and the punk community in Amarillo, Texas, and the result from the subsequent court case sparked debate over injustice in the American judicial system. The title of the film is a reference to one of the nicknames of the town of Amarillo for their nuclear weapon facilities.

Plot 
On December 12, 1997, 19-year-old American punk musician Brian Theodore Deneke (March 9, 1978 – December 12, 1997) was killed in a deliberate hit and run attack in Amarillo, Texas, by 17-year-old Dustin Camp.
Camp was later found guilty of voluntary vehicular manslaughter and sentenced to ten years' probation and a $10,000 fine, which was later dropped. In 2001, he was sentenced to eight years' imprisonment for a variety of parole violations. He was paroled under supervision on July 31, 2006.
The homicide and the outcome of the trial against Camp galvanized the punk community and raised accusations about the social tolerance of the Texan city.
This film is about the events of that night and some of what led up to it, as well as the way the police, the adults and the community re - murdered Brian Deneke, victim blaming and police terrorizing one group of children whilst looking the other way of another group of children for the same actions.

Brian Deneke is a 19 year old from Amarillo, Texas, who is into punk and the punk rock subculture.  He is a local DIY promoter who books touring punk rock bands at a small run down venue.  In this conservative town, there are many teenagers who actively follow punk and they routinely clashed with the jocks from one of the local high school's football team: The Tascosa Rebels.

Cast 
 Dave Davis as Brian
 Glenn Morshower as Cameron Wilson
 Logan Huffman as Ricky
 Lorelei Linklater as Rome
 Maemae Renfrow as Jade
 Dominic Ryan Gabriel as Jason
 Henry Knotts as King
 Eddie Hassell as Oles
 Luke Shelton as Cody Cates
 Major Dodge as Officer Denny

Production 

The film was the first feature film directed by Jameson Brooks. Brooks wrote the script with fellow Amarillo native, Sheldon Chick, and Chick produced the film with Major Dodge. The scenes from the film were shot in Dallas, Amarillo, Rockwall, and Denton, Texas. The cinematography was done by Jake Wilganowski.

Release 
Bomb City was initially screened at Dallas International Film Festival in early 2017. The film was then screened again on 23 January 2018 at Globe-News Center for the Performing Arts in Amarillo. After the screening, the film then received limited release to 17 cities.

Home media 
The film was released digitally on February 9, 2018, and is also available through video-on-demand. The DVD and Blu-Ray released on April 12, 2018.

Reception 

On review aggregator website Rotten Tomatoes, the film holds an approval rating of 75% based on 12 reviews, with an average rating of 6.1/10. On Metacritic, which assigns normalized rating to reviews, the film has a weighted average score of 65 out of 100, based on 5 critics, indicating "generally favorable reviews".

See also 
 Murder of Sophie Lancaster
 Ethan Couch

References

External links 
 

2017 films
2017 crime drama films
American crime drama films
Films about music and musicians
Crime films based on actual events
Drama films based on actual events
Culture of Amarillo, Texas
Films set in Texas
Films shot in Texas
Films shot in Dallas
2010s English-language films
2010s American films